This is a timeline documenting events and facts about English-speaking stand-up comedy in the year 2023.

January 
 January 10: Andrew Santino's special Cheeseburger on Netflix.
 January 29: Louis CK's special Back To The Garden on Louisck.com.
 January 31: Nate Bargatze's special Hello World on Prime Video.

February 
 February 11: Marc Maron's special From Bleak to Dark on HBO Max.
 February 13: Roseanne Barr's special Cancel This! on Fox Nation.
 February 14: Jim Jefferies's special High n' Dry on Netflix.
 February 14: Matt Rife's special Matthew Steven Rife on Moment.co.
 February 21: Kathleen Madigan's special Hunting Bigfoot on Prime Video.
 February 21: Sommore's special Queen Chandelier on Netflix.
 February 24: Drew Lynch's special And These Are Jokes.

 March 
 March 2: Marlon Wayans's special God Loves Me on HBO Max.
 March 4: Chris Rock's special Selective Outrage on Netflix.
 March 9: Kelsey Cook's special The Hustler on YouTube.
 March 13: Russell Brand's special Brandemic.
 March 14: Bert Kreischer's special Razzle Dazzle on Netflix.
 March 15: Kyle Kinane's special Shocks & Struts on YouTube.
 March 28: Mae Martin's special SAP on Netflix.

 April 
 April 4: Mo'Nique's special My Name is Mo'Nique on Netflix.

 April 25: John Mulaney’s special Baby J on Netflix.

 May 
 May 23: Wanda Sykes's special I'm An Entertainer'' on Netflix.

See also 
 List of stand-up comedians
 List of Netflix original stand-up comedy specials

References 

Stand-up comedy
Stand-up comedy
2020s in comedy
Culture-related timelines by year